Horton Park  may refer to:

Horton Park, Blenheim, a cricket ground in Blenheim, New Zealand
Horton Park, Bradford, a park in Bradford, West Yorkshire
Horton Park Avenue, a street in Bradford, West Yorkshire, the location of the Park Avenue ground
Horton Park railway station, a former station in Bradford, West Yorkshire
Horton Park Golf Club, a golf club on the Sunshine Coast, Queensland
Horton Park (Saint Paul, Minnesota), an arboretum in Saint Paul, Minnesota